Nocnocan is an island off the coast of northern Bohol, Philippines. Located in the Camotes Sea, it a part of the chain of islands that are situated in the Danajon Bank, the only double barrier reef of the country. It is governed locally by Barangay Nocnocan, under the jurisdiction of the municipality of Talibon, Bohol. The island is around 13 km. northeast from the port of Talibon. Due to its proximity to the rich fishing grounds of the Danajon Reef, fishing is the main source of livelihood of the residents. They supply sea food, such as fish, crustaceans, mollusks and seaweeds to the markets in Bohol and Metro Cebu. The 2020 census estimates that the population of Nocnocan is 1,785, a decrease of 0.06% from 2015. But even with a decrease in population, the island is still considered to have a very high population density in the country. With an area of 0.04 km2, the population density is 44,625 per km2.

Edcuation
The island has one public school, Nocnocan Elementary School.

Transport

There are no regular or scheduled daily boat trips to the island. To be able to go to Nocnocan, people travel to the island by hiring a chartered motorized bangka docked in Talibon Port or in Pasil Fish Port in Cebu City.

See also 

 List of islands by population density

References 

Islands of Bohol